The International Brain Laboratory (IBL) is a collaborative research group that aims to develop the first global model of decision making in mice. In its first phase, IBL members are recording 100,000's of neurons across virtually all brain structures in mice performing the very same decision. IBL was officially launched in September 2017 thanks to a $10 million grant from Simons Foundation and a £10 million grant from the Wellcome Trust.

The first major scientific milestones for the project are the development of an open source data architecture for large scale neuroscience collaboration and the replication of the behavior across all experimental labs. In late 2019, the IBL released the behavioral data, containing close to 3 million mouse choices. The subsequent milestone involves the assembly of a brain-wide map of activity. This map of activity is being obtained with Neuropixels probes, which allow recording up to 300-1000 neurons simultaneously. Other recording technologies, such as calcium imaging, will be used in the second phase. These data will then be analyzed and integrated to produce the brain-wide model of decision making.

Origin 
IBL was founded in 2016 by Zachary Mainen (Champalimaud Center for the Unknown), Michael Hausser (University College London), and Alexandre Pouget (University of Geneva). These scientists argued in a paper published the same year that, given the complexity of the questions in neuroscience and the scale of the technical challenge, it seems unlikely that the research performed by individual labs will be sufficient to understand how the brain works. Inspired by the remarkable success of large scale collaborations in physics such as CERN or LIGO, they proposed creating similar focused collaborations in neuroscience based on several core principles: 

 A shared ambitious, yet realistic, goal (e.g. a brain-wide model of decision making in a single species), 
 Tight coordination between theorists and experimentalists.
 Standardization of the behavioral tasks, hardware and data analysis to ensure reproducibility and allowing pooling of data,
 Open access to data and resources within and outside the collaboration, and 
 A relatively flat hierarchy and a collaborative decision-making process. 

These principles are at the heart of the IBL collaboration.

Membership 
Mainen, Hausser and Pouget were joined in 2016 by

Larry Abbott (Columbia University)
Dora Angelaki (New York University)
Matteo Carandini (University College London)
Anne Churchland (University of California Los Angeles)
Yang Dan (University of California Berkeley)
Peter Dayan (Max Planck Institute Tuebingen)
 Sophie Deneve (Ecole Normale Superieure)
Ila Fiete (Massachusetts Institute of Technology)
Surya Ganguli (Stanford University)
Kenneth Harris (University College London)
 Peter Latham (University College London)
 Sonja Hofer (University College London)
 Tom Mrsic-Flogel (University College London)
 Liam Paninski (Columbia University)
 Jonathan Pillow (Princeton University)
Ilana Witten (Princeton University)
Tony Zador (Cold Spring Harbor Laboratory)

David Tank and Carlos Brody (both at Princeton University) joined in 2016 but withdrew in 2017 due to conflicts of interest. Nick Steinmetz (University of Washington) joined in 2019, and Tatiana Engel (Cold Spring Harbor Laboratory) in 2020.

References

2017 establishments
2017 in science
Neuroscience projects